"Who Was It?" is a song by Gilbert O'Sullivan from his 1972 album Back to Front. A cover by Hurricane Smith reached No. 23 on the UK Singles Chart.

References

1972 songs
Gilbert O'Sullivan songs
Hurricane Smith songs
Songs written by Gilbert O'Sullivan
MAM Records singles